Martyanikha is a rural locality (a village) in Korobitsynskoye Rural Settlement, Syamzhensky District, Vologda Oblast, Russia. The population was 21 as of 2002.

Geography 
Martyanikha is located 38 km east of Syamzha (the district's administrative centre) by road. Georgiyevskaya is the nearest rural locality.

References 

Rural localities in Syamzhensky District